José Behar is a Cuban-American music executive. Behar has headed EMI Latin and Univision Music Group. He is known to have signed Selena. José Behar was appointed to run the new Latin division in EMI Records. Univision Music Group in 2001.

History with Selena
He watched Selena perform at the 1989 Tejano Music Awards. Behar was searching for new Latin acts and wanted to sign Selena to EMI's label. Behar thought he had discovered the "next Gloria Estefan."  Selena chose EMI Latin's offer because of the potential for a crossover album, and becoming the first artist to sign to the label. Before Selena began recording for her debut album, Selena, Behar and Stephen Finfer requested a crossover album for her.  In 1995, Selena was murdered. Behar said after her passing: "She would have been up there with the Janets and the Madonnas." In July 1995, Selena's 'Dreaming of You' Album premiered in No. 1 Spot. Behar said: "This is what the dream was about in 1989. Seeing it all come to fruition is tremendous."

References

American music industry executives
Selena
Living people
1954 births